Suvarna Sethuve is a 1982 Indian Kannada-language film, directed by Geethapriya and produced by B. P. Baliga, B. S. Baliga and B. M. Baliga. The film stars Vishnuvardhan, Aarathi, Baby Rekha and Dinesh. The musical score was composed by Vijaya Bhaskar. The film was adapted from the novel of the same name by H. G. Radhadevi.

Cast

Vishnuvardhan
Aarathi
Baby Rekha
Dinesh
Rajanand
Seetharam
Sadashiva Brahmavar
Dheerendra Gopal in Guest Appearance
M. S. Umesh

Soundtrack
The music was composed by Vijayabhaskar.

References

External links
 
 

1982 films
1980s Kannada-language films
Films scored by Vijaya Bhaskar
Films based on Indian novels
Films directed by Geethapriya